Maksym Rostyslavovych Dyachuk (born 21 July 2003) is a Ukrainian professional footballer who plays as a centre-back for Ukrainian Premier League club Dynamo Kyiv.

References

External links
 
 

2003 births
Living people
Sportspeople from Zakarpattia Oblast
Ukrainian footballers
Association football defenders
Ukraine youth international footballers
FC Dynamo Kyiv players
FC Oleksandriya players
Ukrainian Premier League players